Bruce Barry may refer to:

 Bruce S. Barry, American television soap opera director and writer
 Bruce Barry (actor) (1934–2017), Australian actor and singer